A leadership spill in the Australian Labor Party, the party of opposition in the Parliament of Australia, was held on 30 April 1968. It followed leader Gough Whitlam's decision to resign the leadership following the party executives refusal to seat new Tasmanian delegate Brian Harradine, to which Whitlam demanded a vote of confidence from his caucus. Whitlam received 38 votes to left-winger Jim Cairns' 32 in an unexpectedly close poll.

Candidates
 Jim Cairns, Member of the ALP Caucus Executive, Member for Yarra
 Gough Whitlam, incumbent Leader, Member for Werriwa

Results
The following table gives the ballot results:

References

Australian Labor Party leadership spills
Australian Labor Party leadership spill